Sí, mi amor may refer to:

 Sí, mi amor (TV series), 1984 Mexican telenovela
 Sí, mi amor (film), 2020 Peruvian film